The University of Michigan School of Social Work is a professional school within the University of Michigan located in Ann Arbor, Michigan.

History 

A formal curriculum in social work was first offered by the University of Michigan College of Literature, Science, and the Arts, in 1921. In 1936, the first Master of Social Work (MSW) degree was offered by the Institute of Public and Social Administration (later to become the Institute of Social Work in 1946). From 1936 to 1951, a total of 348 MSW degrees were granted.

In 1951, the School of Social Work was established to offer a professional educational program on the graduate level leading to advanced degrees, and the program moved from Detroit to Ann Arbor, with Fedele F. Fauri acting as dean until 1970. The school was first located in a small house on Washington and Thayer, before moving into the Frieze Building, where it remained until 1998, when the school moved to a new dedicated building on the corner of South and East University.

During the School of Social Work's first year, 91 full-time and 96 part-time students were enrolled. Today the school averages around 650 enrolled MSW students and 80 enrolled doctoral students. In 1957, the Joint Doctoral Program in Social Work and Social Science was created.

In the past 15 years, the school has ranked either the #1 or #2 school of social work by U.S. News & World Report and ranked in the top three schools of social work for the past 30 years.

Programs offered

Masters of Social Work (MSW) 

The U-M SSW offers a master of social work degree program that offers a variety of concentration options:

Areas of study 

 Interpersonal Practice (or clinical social work): counseling, assessment, diagnosis, and treatment plans for individuals, families, and small groups
 Community Organization (or Community Practice): organize groups and communities for positive change
 Management of Human Services: lead and manage human service organizations
 Social Policy & Evaluation: develop, analyze, and evaluate social policies and programs
 Children & Youth in Families and Society: work with children, adolescents, and families
 Communities and Social Systems: influence laws, legislation, and policy
 Aging in Families and Society: comprehensive care for the aging population
 Mental Health: prevention and treatment of mental and behavioral health disorders
 Health: health promotion and disease prevention, education, treatment, and rehabilitation in public, primary, and long-term care settings

Joint Ph.D. Program: Ph.D. in Social Work & Social Science 

Students who pursue a Ph.D. in Social Work at the U-M SSW must do so jointly with another social science discipline at the U-M.

Joint Ph.D.’s can be in one of the following disciplines:

 Anthropology
 Economics
 Political Science
 Psychology
 Sociology

Undergraduate Minor—Community Action & Social Change 

Undergraduates at U-M can enroll in the Community Action & Social Change (CASC) minor to gain skills, knowledge, and experiences that will prepare them to become effective agents of community action and social change.

Vivian A. and James L. Curtis School of Social Work Research and Training Center 

The Vivian A. and James L. Curtis School of Social Work Research and Training Center serves as a research incubator, evaluation training, and research support services center at the University of Michigan School of Social Work.

The Curtis Center offers research consultation, educational programming and training, and program evaluation training and services for students, postdocs, and outside organizations.

References

External links 
 University of Michigan School of Social Work
 US News & World Report Schools of Social Work Rankings

University of Michigan
Schools of social work in the United States
University of Michigan campus